Tokyo, Japan contains many parks and gardens.

Urban parks and gardens

Note: Figures in bold are approximate values. A green row designates a special ward of Tokyo.

Gallery

Flowers

National parks

There are four national parks in Tokyo:
 Chichibu Tama Kai National Park, in Nishitama and spilling over into Yamanashi and Saitama Prefectures
 Meiji no Mori Takao Quasi-National Park, around Mount Takao to the south of Hachioji.
 Fuji-Hakone-Izu National Park, which includes all of the Izu Islands.
 Ogasawara National Park. As of 2006, efforts were being made to make Ogasawara National Park a UNESCO natural World Heritage Site.

Notes

External links 
 

 
Tokyo
Tokyo
Parks and gardens, Tokyo